Stories is the eighth album by Gloria Gaynor, released in 1980. Failing to produce any hit singles, Stories didn't fare as well as its predecessors and peaked at #178 on the Billboard 200.

This album has yet to be reissued on CD.

Critical reception
Billboard's reviewer noted with satisfaction that "Gaynor deserts the dictates of disco for an album of classic pop-soul songs". He singled out "Ain't No Bigger Fool" and "Make Me Yours" as fine examples of the Motown sound brought up-to-date, with powerful bass lines, beefy brass and call-and-response backup vocals". As well as a couple of ballads, "Don't Read Me Wrong" and "The Luckiest Girl In The World," that "underscore Gaynor's versatility". As a result critic called Stories a "singer's best LP in years".

Track listing

Personnel
Gloria Gaynor - vocals
Nathan East - bass guitar
Freddie Perren - keyboards
Bob Bowles - guitar
Bob Zimmitti - percussion
Ernie Watts - saxophone, flute
James Gadson - drums
Paulinho da Costa - congas
Nathan Watts - bass guitar
David T. Walker - guitar
Clarence McDonald - keyboards
Alan Estes - percussion
Gayle Levant - harp
Bobbye Hall - congas
Julia Waters - backing vocals
Maxine Waters - backing vocals
Stephanie Spruill - backing vocals

References

External links
 

1980 albums
Gloria Gaynor albums
Albums produced by Freddie Perren
Polydor Records albums